First Baptist Church is a historic church at located 200-228 N. Main Street in Fall River, Massachusetts. The church was built in 1850 and was a work of local architect Josiah Brown. It is built of wood with brick trim in the Gothic Revival style. The tower originally contained a tall spire and corner finials that were destroyed during Hurricane Carol in 1954. In 1871, extensive repairs were made and the Meeting House was enlarged.

It was added to the National Register of Historic Places in 1983.

See also
National Register of Historic Places listings in Fall River, Massachusetts

References

Baptist churches in Massachusetts
Churches in Fall River, Massachusetts
Churches on the National Register of Historic Places in Massachusetts
National Register of Historic Places in Fall River, Massachusetts